Callitris oblonga, also known as the South Esk pine, pygmy cypress pine, pigmy cypress pine, river pine, or Tasmanian cypress pine, is a species of conifer in the family Cupressaceae. It is endemic to Australia, where it is native to New South Wales and Tasmania, with one subspecies introduced in Victoria. It is considered vulnerable and faces a number of threats including land clearing, habitat degradation, and damage from or competition with invasive species.

Taxonomy 
There are three subspecies currently recognised:

 C. o. oblonga – northeast Tasmania, introduced in Victoria
 C. o. corangensis (K.D. Hill) – New England Tablelands in northern New South Wales
 C. o. parva (K.D. Hill) – Corang River catchment in southern New South Wales

Description 
Callitris oblonga is an evergreen shrub or small tree growing to 5 meters tall with leaves measuring 4-5 millimeters long. This species is monoecious. The female cones are egg shaped, measuring 12-15 millimeters in diameter, sessile or borne on short fruiting branchlets, and may occur singly or in clusters.

References

oblonga
Pinales of Australia
Flora of Tasmania
Vulnerable flora of Australia
Tasmanian forests
Taxonomy articles created by Polbot